The North American Grappling Association (NAGA) is a grappling and Brazilian Jiu-Jitsu (BJJ) promotion started in 1995. NAGA  Submission Grappling and Brazilian Jiu-Jitsu tournaments are held throughout North America and Europe. NAGA is the largest submission grappling association in the world with over 700,000 participants world-wide, including some of the top submission grapplers and MMA fighters in the world. NAGA grappling tournaments consist of gi and no-gi divisions. No-Gi competitors compete under rules drafted by NAGA. Gi competitors compete under standardized Brazilian Jiu-Jitsu rules. NAGA also promotes MMA events which they term Reality Fighting.

Skill Levels
Competitors in NAGA competitions are broken into weight divisions, skill levels, and age categories.

Adults (18 years & over) 
 Novice (6 months total grappling experience)
 Beginner (6 months to 2 years total grappling experience)
 Intermediate (2 years to 5 years total grappling experience. BJJ blue belts are Intermediate)
 Expert (5 years + total grappling experience. BJJ purple, brown, black belts are Expert)

Children (13 years & under) & Teens (14-17 years)
 Novice (6 months & under total grappling experience. Children are not allowed to do submissions)
 Beginner (6 months to 1 year total grappling experience)
 Intermediate (1 year to 2 years total grappling experience)
 Advance (2 years to 3 years total grappling experience)
 Expert (3 years + total grappling experience) 

Total grappling experience includes but is not limited to; wrestling experience, BJJ experience, judo experience, sambo experience, JKD experience, etc. Any training that consists of grappling is counted towards your total experience. Former Champions Frank Mir, Joe Fiorentino, Anthony Porcelli, and Shonie Carter.

Weight Divisions

Men's No-Gi & Gi

Women's Gi & No-Gi

Children's No-Gi & Gi Grappling Divisions (13 years of age & under)

Teen's NO-GI & GI Grappling Divisions (14 to 17 years of age)

Reality Fighting 
NAGA's MMA division, Reality Fighting, holds mixed martial arts events in New Jersey and Massachusetts. The rules that govern each match are set by each state's athletic commission.

Reality Fighting previous champions include BJJ Black Belt and UFC veteran Gabriel Gonzaga, current Reality Fighting Light-Heavyweight Champion and The Ultimate Fighter: Team Nogueira vs. Team Mir veteran Mike Stewart and former UFC Lightweight Champion Khabib Nurmagomedov. Some other notable fighters who fought in Reality Fighting are Frankie Edgar, Joe Lauzon, Kenny Florian, Tim Sylvia, Jorge Rivera, Kurt Pellegrino, Jim Miller, Dan Miller, Rob Font, Joe Proctor, Matt Bessette, Josh Diekmann, and Josh Grispi.

References

External links 
 Official website for the North American Grappling Association

Brazilian jiu-jitsu organizations
Brazilian jiu-jitsu competitions
Sports organizations established in 1995
International sports organizations
Grappling competitions
No-Gi Brazilian jiu-jitsu competitions